The Call was an American rock band formed in Santa Cruz, California in 1980. The main lineup consisted of members Michael Been, Scott Musick, Tom Ferrier and Jim Goodwin. The band released nine studio albums over the next two decades before disbanding in 2000. Their 1986 song, "I Still Believe (Great Design)", was covered by Tim Cappello and included in the 1987 film The Lost Boys. The band also achieved significant success with "Let the Day Begin" in 1989 which reached No. 1 on the Billboard U.S. Mainstream Rock chart and was later used as a campaign theme song for Al Gore's 2000 Presidential Campaign.

Formation and early career
The original lineup of the Call was Been (lead vocals, guitar), Musick (drums, percussion), Ferrier (guitar) and Greg Freeman (bass). This lineup grew to include Steve Huddleston on keyboards from 1981 through 1983. Goodwin joined the band as keyboardist in 1983, replacing Huddleston. Freeman departed in 1984 with Joe Read taking over bass duties for Scene Beyond Dreams. Both Been and Musick were originally from Oklahoma but didn't meet until independently moving to California. The Call were earlier known as Motion Pictures and served as Phil Seymour's band at that time.

Beginning with their self-titled debut in 1982, they went on to produce and release nine studio albums by 2000. The eponymous premiere album was recorded in England, and Been recalled in a 1987 interview that the band was in an exploratory phase at this point. He further noted, "The Call was a compassionate album, but it probably came out as anger." Peter Gabriel liked the band so much that he called them the "future of American music" and asked them to open for him during his 1982–1983 "Plays Live" tour.

Their next album, Modern Romans, was notable for its political content. Been later stated, "There was a great deal happening politically—Grenada, Lebanon, or the government saying the Russians are evil and the Russian government probably saying the same about us. That kind of thinking inspired me to write the last lines of 'Walls Came Down'." Garth Hudson of the Band played keyboards on these first two records.

This was followed by Scene Beyond Dreams. Been referred to it as the Call's "metaphysical" album. With a strong poetic sense to the lyrics and a change in instrumentation, the change in sound is notable.

Commercial hits and extended break 

The band's next album, Reconciled, was recorded in mid-1985. Prior to this, the band had not had a recording contract for two years, due to what Been described as "legal bickering" between the Call's former record label, Mercury, and their management company." However, when a new deal was signed with Elektra Records, the band produced their most commercially successful album to date. Peter Gabriel, Simple Minds' Jim Kerr, Hudson and Hudson's bandmate Robbie Robertson—both of the Band—all performed as guests on the album, which was released in 1986. Several tracks from the album became hits on the Mainstream Rock Chart, and one of these tracks, "I Still Believe (Great Design)" (aka "I Still Believe") appears on the soundtrack of the 1986 film The Whoopee Boys.

The following year, "I Still Believe" was covered by Tim Cappello for the film The Lost Boys. In the film, Cappello memorably stole the scene as a shirtless saxophonist belting out the tune on the beach. The song was also covered by contemporary Christian musician Russ Taff on his 1987 self-titled album, and more recently by the Protomen as part of their 2015 cover album. In 2017 Klayton from Celldweller Covered "Too Many Tears" on The Cover Up. In 2018, a cover version of "I Still Believe" appeared in the Paramount television series Waco about the Branch Davidian tragedy. "I Still Believe" also featured prominently in last episode of the second season of the TV show Reservation Dogs in 2022, eventually including a cameo by Cappello on the saxophone.

The band released Into the Woods in 1987, which Been referred to as his favorite album. In 1989 they released Let the Day Begin, whose title track reached No. 1 on the US Mainstream Rock chart. Their label under-ordered physical copies of the album and the resultant decline in sales limited their chart position.  

Red Moon, the group's final studio album for a major label, was released in 1990. The album included background vocals by U2's Bono on the track "What's Happened to You". The album took a turn into the new genre of Americana, and was out of step with the shock of grunge music taking over the airwaves. Following the Red Moon tour, the band took an "extended break".

Reunion and legacy 

Rumors regarding the band's dissolution were fueled by Been's solo releases in the early 1990s including the song "To Feel This Way" for the 1992 film Light Sleeper and a 1994 solo album On the Verge of a Nervous Breakthrough; however, in 1996, Warner Bros. Records. released The Best of The Call, which featured a selection of old favorites and a few new songs including two of Been's solo songs, "Us" and "To Feel This Way", which had been re-recorded with the full band. 

In 1997 they released a new studio album, To Heaven and Back, on Fingerprint Records. A few years later, a music fan tracked Been down and helped him master and release their first and only live album, a recording from their 1990 tour, which was released as Live Under the Red Moon in 2000 on the indie label Conspiracy Music. The band disbanded that same year.

Al Gore used "Let the Day Begin" as his campaign song in the 2000 U.S. Presidential Election and Tom Vilsack used it as his song during his brief 2008 U.S. Presidential Election campaign.

A 2009 temporary exhibition at the Oklahoma History Center about rock music in the state was called "Another Hot Oklahoma Night: A Rock & Roll Exhibit". The name of the exhibition was taken from a line in the band's song, "Oklahoma", which was also one of the ten finalists in a 2009 vote for Oklahoma's official state rock song. A book was published of the same name featuring the Call and numerous other Oklahoma musicians.

Michael Been died on August 19, 2010, after suffering a heart attack backstage at the Pukkelpop music festival in Hasselt, Belgium, where he was working as sound engineer for his son's, Robert Levon Been, band Black Rebel Motorcycle Club.

On April 18 and 19, 2013, band members Scott Musick, Tom Ferrier, and Jim Goodwin reunited for a series of shows in San Francisco and Los Angeles with Robert Levon Been of BRMC taking over the role of bass and vocals. A Tribute to Michael Been featuring Robert Levon Been (of BRMC) was released on September 2, 2014. The songs were recorded during the 2013 show. The CD version included 14 songs while the special CD and DVD combo pack, and a digital deluxe version had 19. A limited edition vinyl release was also released. In 2015, an hour-long TV special using footage from the DVD was shown on VH1 Classic and Palladia.

On April 22, 2017, the Call reunited and played a show in New Orleans, Louisiana at Siberia, with special guest vocalists Ray Ganucheau, Michael Divita and J.D. Buhl. 

On August 28, 2021, The Call was inducted into the Oklahoma Music Hall of Fame. Scott Musick and Steve Huddleston were present to accept their awards. Michael Been's sister accepted his posthumous award on his behalf.

Members 

Michael Been – lead vocals, bass, guitar, keyboards (1980–2000)
Tom Ferrier – guitar, vocals (1980–2000, 2013, 2017)
Greg Freeman – bass, vocals (1980–1984)
Scott Musick – drums, percussion, vocals (1980–2000, 2013, 2017)
Steve Huddleston – keyboards, vocals (1981–1983)
Jim Goodwin – keyboards, vocals (1984–2000, 2013, 2017)
Joe Read – bass, vocals (1984–1986) (Read was also a member of Strapps, The Textones, and Code Blue)

Discography

Albums
Studio
 The Call, 1982
 Modern Romans, 1983 US No. 84, AUS No. 50
 Scene Beyond Dreams, 1984 US No. 204
 Reconciled, 1986 US No. 82
 Into the Woods, 1987 US No. 123
 Let the Day Begin, 1989 US No. 64
 Red Moon, 1990
 To Heaven and Back, 1997

Live
 Live Under the Red Moon, 2000
 A Tribute to Michael Been featuring Robert Levon Been (BRMC), 2014

Compilation
 The Walls Came Down: The Best of the Mercury Years, 1991
 The Best of The Call, 1997
 20th Century Masters – The Millennium Collection: The Best of the Call, 2000
The Call - Collected, 2019

Singles

References

External links
 
 

Rock music groups from California
American new wave musical groups
Musical groups from San Francisco
Musical groups established in 1980
Musical groups disestablished in 2000